Shibolim (lit. Ears) is a religious moshav in southern Israel. Located near Netivot and covering 4,000 dunams, it falls under the jurisdiction of Sdot Negev Regional Council.

History
The village was established on 22 February 1952 by immigrants from Iran and Kurdistan, who had previously been living in Yakhini. It was initially named Sharsheret Bet, before adopting its current name, taken from the Tanakh. Notable residents include Eliezer Avtabi, a member of the Knesset for the National Religious Party.

References

External links

Shibolim Negev Information Centre

Iranian-Jewish culture in Israel
Kurdish-Jewish culture in Israel
Moshavim
Religious Israeli communities
Populated places established in 1952
Populated places in Southern District (Israel)
1952 establishments in Israel